Triple Divide Peak may refer to:

Triple Divide Peak (Tulare County, California)
Triple Divide Peak (Madera County, California)
Triple Divide Peak (Montana) in Glacier National Park